Gopakumar Thiruvancheril is an Indian Assistant Professor of molecular electronics from Indian Institutes of Technology. He is an author of certain peer-reviewed articles two of which, as of 2013, were cited over 60 times and appeared in such journals Journal of Physical Chemistry B and C, including others.
He completed his Ph.D. in Physics at TU Chemnitz.

Selected publications

References

Indian electronics engineers
Living people
20th-century births
Academic staff of the Indian Institutes of Technology
Year of birth missing (living people)